16 Squadron or 16th Squadron may refer to:

 No. 16 Squadron (Finland), a unit of the Finnish Air Force
 No. 16 Squadron PAF, a fighter squadron of the Pakistan Air Force
 16 Squadron SAAF, a unit of the South African Air Force
 No. 16 Squadron RNZAF, a unit of the Royal New Zealand Air Force
 No. 16 Squadron RAF, a unit of the United Kingdom Royal Air Force
 16 Tank Transporter Squadron (United Kingdom), a unit of the British Army
 16th Airlift Squadron, a unit of the United States Air Force
 16th Space Control Squadron, a unit of the United States Air Force
 16th Special Operations Squadron, a unit of the United States Air Force
 16th Weapons Squadron, a unit of the United States Air Force
 Marine Aviation Logistics Squadron 16, a unit of the United States Marine Corps
 16th Reconnaissance Squadron of Anti-Aircraft Artillery, a unit of the Yugoslav Air Force

See also
 No. 16 Air Observation Post Flight RAAF, a unit of the Royal Australian Air Force
 16th Army (disambiguation)
 16th Wing (disambiguation)
 16th Group (disambiguation)
 16th Division (disambiguation)
 16th Brigade (disambiguation)
 16th Regiment (disambiguation)